Julia ”Jully” Ramsay ( Ekström; 1865—1919) was a Finnish historian and genealogist.

Career
Ramsay is notable not only as the first woman genealogist in Finland, but also as a pioneer of Finnish genealogy in general.

She is best remembered for her monumental four-part work, Frälsesläkter i Finland intill stora ofreden ( 'Noble families in Finland before the Great Wrath'), published 1909—1916, and based on her extensive archive research over many years.

She also published a personal history collectionSkuggor vid vägen ( 'Shadows by the roadside') (1917) about 16th and 17th century events and people of Finland.

Ramsay was the first woman to be bestowed an honorary membership of the Genealogical Society of Finland, more than half a century before the next woman was granted the same honour.

She was also active in many other areas of society, including education and a deaf charity.

Personal life
Julia Maria Ekström was born to an upper middle class family; her parents were the military engineering officer Carl August Ekström and Alexandrine  Hackman, of the Hackman industrial family.

She married, at age 18, the mathematician and finance executive, later Minister of Finance, August Ramsay, of the noble Ramsay family; the couple had five children, including the economist and politician Henrik Ramsay.

She died at the relatively young age of 53, following a long illness.

References

External links
Obituary in Suomen Nainen (12 April 1919, issue 14, p. 220; in Finnish)

Finnish genealogists
19th-century Finnish historians
Finnish women historians
People from Leppävirta
1865 births
1919 deaths
19th-century Finnish women writers